Singtel Optus Pty Limited (commonly referred to as Optus) is an Australian telecommunications company headquartered in Macquarie Park, New South Wales, Australia. It is a wholly owned subsidiary of Singaporean telecommunications company Singtel. Optus is the second-largest wireless carrier in Australia, with 10.5 million subscribers as of 2019.

The company trades under the Optus brand, while maintaining several wholly owned subsidiaries, such as Uecomm in the network services market and Alphawest in the ICT services sector. To provide services, Optus mostly owns and operates its own network infrastructure, It provides services both directly to end users and also acts as a wholesaler to other service providers such as Exetel and Amaysim. Through its Optus 'Yes' brand, it provides broadband, and wireless internet services. Other wholesale services include Satellite and 4G Mobile.

The company was originally known as Optus Communications Pty Limited. It went through the names Cable & Wireless Optus Pty Limited, Cable & Wireless Optus Limited and SingTel Optus Limited before changing to its present name.

Optus is divided into four major business areas – Mobile; Business; Wholesale; and Consumer & Multimedia.

History

AUSSAT and deregulation
Optus can trace its beginnings back to the formation of the Government-owned AUSSAT Pty Limited in 1981. In 1982, Aussat selected the Hughes 376 for their initial satellites, with the first, AUSSAT A1, launched in August 1985. AUSSAT satellites were used for both military and civilian satellite communications, and delivering television services to remote outback communities.

With Aussat operating at a loss and with moves to deregulate telecommunications in Australia, the government decided to sell Aussat, coupled with a telecommunications licence. The licence was sold to Optus Communications – a consortium including:
 logistics firm Mayne Nickless (24.99%);
 UK telecommunications company Cable & Wireless (24.50%);
 US telecommunications company BellSouth (24.50%);
 AIDC Limited (10.00%);
 insurance and investment company AMP (10.00%); and
 insurance and investment company National Mutual (6.02%).

The new telecommunications company was designed to provide competition to then government owned telecommunications company Telecom Australia, now known as Telstra.

Early history

Optus gained the second general carrier licence in January 1991.

After privatisation, AUSSAT became Optus and its first offering to the general public was to offer long-distance calls at cheaper rates than that of its competitor Telstra. The long-distance calling rates on offer were initially available by consumers dialing 1 before the area code and phone number. Following this, a ballot process was conducted by then regulator AUSTEL, with customers choosing their default long-distance carrier. Customers who made no choice or did not respond to the mailout campaign automatically remained as a Telstra long-distance customer. Customers who remained with Telstra could dial the override code of 1456 before the area code and phone number to manually select Optus as the carrier for that single call. Since 1 July 1998, consumers have the choice of preselecting their preferred long-distance carrier or dialling the override code before dialling a telephone number.

The group began by building an interstate fibre optic cable and a series of exchanges between Optus' interstate network and Telstra's local network. It also laid fibre optics into major office buildings and industrial areas, and focused on high bandwidth local, (interstate) long distance, and interstate calls for business. In its early years, Optus was only able to offer local and long-distance calls to residential customers through Telstra's local phone network. Telstra would carry residential to residential calls to Optus' exchanges, and then the calls would be switched to Optus' long-distance fibre optic network.

Optus was the main sponsor of the 1997 ARL season.

2022 cyberattack
Around 22 September 2022, Optus systems sustained a significant cyberattack that resulted in a major data breach of both current and former customers' personal information, including customers’ names, dates of birth, phone numbers and email addresses, with a smaller subset of customers having their street addresses, driving licence details and passport numbers leaked. Optus CEO Kelly Bayer Rosmarin urged customers to exercise "heightened awareness" regarding transactions with their Optus and other accounts. Rosmarin emphasised that passwords were not compromised. The CEO said that the "worst-case scenario" regarding the number of customers whose data had been leaked was 9.8 million customers, but believes the actual number to be far lower.

On 24 September 2022, Australian news outlets The Age and The Sydney Morning Herald reported that Optus was investigating the authenticity of a ransom demand of US$1 million made on a hacking forum. The demand gave Optus one week to pay the ransom in cryptocurrency else the data will be sold for US $300,000 to whoever else wants it.

On 6 October, the Australian Federal Police announced the arrest of a 19-year-old man who had allegedly threatened 93 Optus customers by saying that he would use their information leaked in the attack to commit financial crimes, unless they paid AUD $2,000.

In response to the cyberattack, the Australian federal government announced emergency regulation on 6 October, in the form of a 12 month amendment to the Telecommunications Regulations 2021 to "enable telecommunications companies to temporarily share approved government identifier information with regulated financial services entities."

On 11 October, the Office of the Australian Information Commissioner launched an investigation, the aim of which is to explore the company's handling of customers' data.

Corporate affairs

Chief Executive Officer 
Kelly Bayer Rosmarin commenced as CEO of Optus and Consumer Australia on 1 April 2020.

A senior executive, Kelly joined Optus as Deputy CEO on 1 March 2019 following a variety of executive roles including Group Executive, Institutional Banking and Markets at the Commonwealth Bank of Australia.

The hybrid fibre-coax rollout
These practices meant that Optus was the largest customer of Telstra. To become competitive Optus would need to lay its own local phone network. To provide a killer application for this, the Australian Federal government sold subscription television licences. Optus, as well as the Seven Network, businessman Kerry Stokes and American cable company Cablevision, formed the Optus Vision consortium. News Corporation and Telstra created the rival Foxtel consortium.

Telstra's local phone network did not have the capability to deliver Foxtel pay television to consumers in the early 1990s, so Telstra identified a need to create a broadband network to support this new product.

As Telstra and Optus could not agree on terms for a joint broadband cable roll out, they laid two competing cable networks, in addition to Telstra's existing copper network, at a combined cost estimated of over A$6bn.

Whilst Telstra focused on creating a broadband network specifically for broadcast, Optus designed their cable network to provide telephony services in addition to broadcast television.

Optus is no longer a customer of Telstra's after deciding to move the funding used to lease Telstra's copper network into constructing their hybrid fibre-coaxial network, the first in Australia.

Takeovers
Cable and Wireless with 24.5% stakeholder bought out Bell South's equal 24.5% shareholding in July 1997. The company returned to profitability in 1998 and changed its name to Cable and Wireless Optus Pty Limited. Government relaxation of foreign ownership restrictions paved the way for the company to be floated - with Cable and Wireless increasing its holding to 52.5%) - and listed on the Australian Stock Exchange on 17 November 1998.

During 2001, Singtel launched a takeover bid for Cable and Wireless Optus which was ultimately successful and the company became known as Singtel Optus Pty Limited.

In May 2004, Optus announced a $226.8 million bid for UEComm. The takeover was approved in July and completed in August.

In July 2005, Optus announced it would acquire Alphawest Ltd. for A$25.9 million. The buyout was completed in November 2005 and Alphawest is now an operating division of Optus Business.

On 12 January 2006, Optus acquired the remaining 74.15% of Virgin Mobile Australia for U$22.6 m, giving it 100% ownership.

OptusNet

Optus Communications offered its first business-focused internet products in 1998 under the OptusNet product family, offering in-house developed dial-up and high-speed services. Optus purchased one of Australia's pioneer ISPs, Microplex, in 1998 to provide consumer dial-up internet services. Separate to this, under the Optus Vision brand, a cable broadband arm began as a joint venture with U.S. cable and content provider Excite@Home and was known as Optus@Home from its introduction in 1999 until it was renamed in 2002. ADSL services were offered from February 2004. ADSL2+ services were provided from December 2005.

OPEL Networks
In June 2007, joint venture subsidiary OPEL Networks was awarded government funding towards the cost of building a regional broadband network. Optus was to be contracted to build the network on behalf of OPEL.

In April 2008, after a change of the Federal Government from the Liberal Party of Australia coalition to the Australian Labor Party, the new government terminated the funding agreement and the project was halted, with its functions to be replaced by the National Broadband Network.

Terria

Optus is part of a consortium – now known as Terria – that in July 2006 announced their intention to make a combined bid to build the proposed National Broadband Network.

Products and services

Optus's Customer Solutions and Services (CS&S) organisation is responsible for providing support to Optus Business customers. CS&S works with Optus' subsidiary Alphawest to support information technology services across Optus' large business, corporate and government client base.

Retail services are sold to customers via phone, internet or through retail outlets, especially franchise chains such as Optus World, Network Communications, Strathfield, Telechoice, and Allphones.

Key Optus products and services include:

Voice
 Residential and Commercial POTS for local and long-distance telephony
 Commercial VoIP and VoDSL
 Intelligent Network applications, such as free call, 1300 and Interactive voice response services

Wireless
 GSM/GPRS utilising 900 MHz/1800 MHz covering 98.5% of the population
 3G/HSPA provided by 2100 MHz for large regional centres and metropolitan and 900 MHz for regional as well as metropolitan coverage. The dual frequencies covers 98.5% (98.8% with the use of an external antenna) of the population
 4G/LTE provided by 700 / 1800 / 2100 / 2300 / 2600 MHz Covering 95.9% of the Australian population (As of July 2017).
 5G provided by 2300MHz and 3500MHz
 Satellite Telephony covering all of Australia.

Internet access
 NBN Internet (via Cable, FTTB, FTTC, FTTN, FTTP, Fixed wireless and Satellite)
 Residential Dial-Up Internet in all states
 Residential Broadband Internet (via cable and DSL) in all states (except the Northern Territory).
 Commercial and wholesale internet access
 Secure Gateway services for Federal Government departments
 NBN WIRELESS - not continued for new connects

Television
 Optus Television service provided in Sydney, Melbourne & Brisbane, including Foxtel Digital

Subsidiaries
A number of notable wholly owned subsidiaries operate as part of the Singtel Optus group. These are:
 Information Technology & Network Services
 Alphawest
 Uecomm
 Mobile Telephony
 SIMplus
 Virgin Mobile Australia

Until 20 January 2013, Optus sold mobile services under the brand name Boost Mobile.

Optus also has a 50% stake in the now defunct OPEL Networks.

Other wholly owned subsidiaries of note no longer have a significant active role as individual entities. These are as follows:

Reef Networks was formed in 1999 to provide an optical fibre link between Brisbane and Cairns in Queensland. Optus gained exclusive access to this link in 2001, ahead of acquiring the organisation in 2005.

XYZed was established by Optus in 2000 to provide wholesale business-grade DSL services under an individual brand, but today provides a collection of products only as part of the Optus Wholesale & Satellite division. XYZed established a network of DSLAMs inside Telstra telephone exchanges, utilising Unconditioned Local Loop services to reach end users.

Infrastructure
Optus' fully owned network infrastructure consists of the following:

Network backbone

 ExtraTerrestrial Fibre Optic Network
 Cairns to Brisbane
 Brisbane to Sydney (fully diverse over two physically separate paths)
 Sydney to Melbourne (fully diverse over two physically separate paths, one via Canberra, one via the coast)
 Melbourne to Adelaide
 Adelaide to Perth
 SDH Digital Microwave
 Hobart to Launceston
 Satellite
 Fleet of geostationary satellites (See Optus fleet of satellites)
 International Earth Stations in Sydney and Perth
 National Earth Stations in Brisbane, Canberra, Melbourne, Adelaide, Perth, Hobart and Darwin
 Regional exchanges in Sydney (Rosebery), Melbourne, Brisbane, Canberra, Adelaide and Perth.
 Telehousing Data Centres in Melbourne and Sydney

Customer access network

 Hybrid fibre-coaxial (HFC) network in Sydney, Brisbane and Melbourne, providing consumer fixed telephony, cable internet and cable television services.
 CBD optical fibre rings in Sydney, Melbourne, Brisbane, Adelaide, Perth, Canberra and Wollongong, providing direct access for corporate and government services.
 DSLAMs in certain Telstra local telephone exchanges in all states. Originally only providing business-grade DSL services, newer installations also provide consumer DSL and POTS telephony.

OptusNet is one of only five ISPs in Australia to provide Cable internet (the other four are BigPond, Neighbourhood Cable, TransACT and e-wire). In August 2010, OptusNet released an upgrade of its HFC network to the DOCSIS 3.0 standard, which enabled customers to access a maximum theoretical downstream bandwidth of 100 Megabits. OptusNet is also one of the few ISPs in Australia to currently provide ADSL2+ via its own DSLAMs, which it also resells to other ISPs.

Mobile network
Mobile network equipment is from Nortel, Nokia and Huawei and antennas are sourced from Andrews, RFS, Argus and Kathrein.

The Optus network operates on the following bandwidth frequencies across Australia:
 3G UMTS 900/2100 MHz
 4G LTE 700 / 1800 / 2100 / 2300 / 2600 MHz network which has been in progressive rollout since 2012. VoLTE is currently being rolled out across Australia. For now, VoLTE is only available in CBD and metro areas in Sydney, Melbourne, Adelaide, Brisbane, Perth and Canberra on selected devices purchased on postpaid contracts. Until VoLTE has been fully rolled out, voice calling is still reliant on the 3G network (and formerly the 2G network until it was terminated).
 5G NR 3500 MHz rollout started in October 2019

The 2G GSM 900/1800 MHz network was terminated on 3 April 2017 in Western Australia and Northern Territory. 2G GSM was completely terminated on 1 August 2017 when 2G was disconnected in Victoria, New South Wales, Australian Capital Territory, Queensland, Tasmania and South Australia. To remain connected, a device that is capable of running 3G at 900 MHz is now required after 2G was completely disconnected across Australia.

Partly owned infrastructure
Part-owned network infrastructure includes:
 3G mobile network, a joint venture with Vodafone Australia
 Southern Cross Cable, a fully diverse submarine optical fibre link across the Pacific Ocean between Sydney, New South Wales and California in the United States. The Singtel group owns a 40% interest in Southern Cross Cables Limited. This interest was originally owned by Singtel Optus Pty Limited, before ownership was transferred to parent company Singtel during the March 2006 - June 2006 quarter.

Advertising and sponsorship
 Between 1994 to 2005 Optus had the naming rights to the Carlton football clubs original home ground in Princes Park. It was called Optus Oval until the ground was retired by the AFL in 2005  
In 2016, Optus signed a 10-year partnership agreement with the Australian Olympic Committee to be the official partner of the Australian Olympic Team and the Australian Paralympic Team until 2026.

In 2017, Optus won naming rights to Perth Stadium where it would be known as Optus Stadium. Optus and the Government of Western Australia agreed to a 10-year naming right worth approximately A$50 million.

Optus also has a long-term partnership with the Adelaide Crows in the AFL. Optus has been a partner of the Collingwood Magpies in the AFL Women's since 2018.

Optus is the current major sponsor for the No. 25 Walkinshaw Andretti United Holden ZB Commodore driven by Chaz Mostert

Outsourcing
Since 2005, Optus has outsourced some customer service functions to Concentrix and 247.ai, with the outsourcer providing 800 staff operating offshore in India, supplementing Optus' 3,000-plus onshore call centre staff. Some functions have also been supplemented in the Philippines. Optus also uses 24/7 Inc. for telephone & chat based offshore support.

In October 2006, Optus announced that it would outsource 100 contracting jobs to another Singtel subsidiary, IT company NCS, in Singapore.

Achievement and Rewards

See also
 4G Australia
 Internet in Australia
 National Broadband Network
 Telecommunications in Australia

References

External links
 
 Photos: Optus's new home (ZDNet Australia)

 
Australian companies established in 1981
Companies based in Sydney
Telecommunications companies established in 1981
Australian brands
Internet service providers of Australia
Mobile phone companies of Australia
Satellite operators
Temasek Holdings
Telecommunications companies of Australia
Australian subsidiaries of foreign companies
1998 initial public offerings
2001 mergers and acquisitions
Former Commonwealth Government-owned companies of Australia